Silvana Tabares (born January 7, 1979) is a member of the Chicago City Council from the 23rd ward. Prior to her June 15, 2018 appointment to the City Council, she had served in the Illinois House of Representatives representing the 21st district since January 2013.

State House career
Being sworn in in January 2013, she served in the Illinois House of Representatives representing the 21st district. Said district includes all or parts of the Chicago neighborhoods of Archer Heights, Brighton Park, Garfield Ridge, McKinley Park, South Lawndale and the Lower West Side along with the nearby suburbs of Stickney, Forest View, Lyons, Riverside, Summit and Bedford Park

During her time in the Illinois House of Representatives, she was viewed as an ally of Speaker Michael Madigan.

Celina Villanueva was appointed to succeed Tabares in the Illinois House of Representatives upon Tabares resignation to accept an appointment to the Chicago City Council.

In 2016, Tabares was a presidential elector from Illinois.

Aldermanic career
Tabares was appointed by Mayor Rahm Emanuel to replace retiring 23rd Ward alderman Michael R. Zalewski on the Chicago City Council. She took office June 28, 2018.

Tabares was elected to a full term as alderman in 2019.

References

External links
Representative Silvana Tabares (D) at the Illinois General Assembly
 
Rep. Silvana Tabares at Illinois House Democrats

1979 births
21st-century American politicians
Columbia College Chicago alumni
Hispanic and Latino American women in politics
Hispanic and Latino American state legislators in Illinois
Living people
Democratic Party members of the Illinois House of Representatives
Women state legislators in Illinois
Chicago City Council members appointed by Rahm Emanuel
2016 United States presidential electors
2020 United States presidential electors
21st-century American women politicians